Dybvig is a surname. Notable people with the surname include:

Evan Dybvig (born 1975), American skier
Per Dybvig (born 1964), Norwegian illustrator, visual artist, and animator
Philip H. Dybvig (born 1955), American economist
Diamond–Dybvig model
R. Kent Dybvig, American professor